Kindling is a 1915 American drama film produced and directed by Cecil B. DeMille and starring Charlotte Walker, in her film debut. The film is based on a 1911 Broadway play by Charles A. Kenyon which starred Margaret Illington and was produced by her husband Major Bowes, later of radio fame.

Cast
 Charlotte Walker as Maggie Schultz
 Thomas Meighan as 'Honest' Heine Schultz
 Raymond Hatton as Steve Bates
 Mrs. Lewis McCord as Mrs. Bates
 William Elmer as Rafferty (as Billy Elmer)
 Lillian Langdon as Mrs. Jane Burke-Smith
 Florence Dagmar as Alice Burke-Smith
 Tom Forman as Dr. Taylor
 Tex Driscoll as Detective (uncredited)
 Ben Hall as Young Thief (uncredited)
 Lucien Littlefield as Fence (uncredited)
 Jeanie Macpherson as Mrs. Burke-Smith's French Maid (uncredited)

References

External links

1915 films
1915 crime drama films
American silent feature films
American black-and-white films
American crime drama films
Films directed by Cecil B. DeMille
1910s American films
Silent American drama films